The following Union Army units and commanders fought in the Atlanta campaign of the American Civil War. The Confederate order of battle is listed separately. Order of battle compiled from the army organization during the campaign.

This order of battle covers the second phase of the campaign, July 17 – September 8, 1864. The period May 1 – July 17, 1864, is listed separately.

Abbreviations used

Military rank
 MG = Major General
 BG = Brigadier General
 Col = Colonel
 Ltc = Lieutenant Colonel
 Maj = Major
 Cpt = Captain

Other
 w = wounded
 mw = mortally wounded
 k = killed

Military Division of the Mississippi

MG William T. Sherman
Chief of Artillery: BG William F. Barry
Headquarters Guard: 7th Company Ohio Sharpshooters: Lieut. William McCrory

Army of the Cumberland

MG George Henry Thomas
Chief of Artillery: BG John M. Brannan
Escort: Company I, 1st Ohio Cavalry: Lieut. Henry C. Reppert

IV Corps

MG Oliver O. Howard
MG David S. Stanley

XIV Corps

MG John M. Palmer
BG Richard W. Johnson
BG Jefferson C. Davis

XX Corps

MG Joseph Hooker
BG Alpheus S. Williams
MG Henry Slocum

Cavalry Corps
BG Washington Elliott, Chief of Cavalry, Army of the Cumberland

Army of the Tennessee

MG James B. McPherson (k July 22)
MG John A. Logan
MG Oliver O. Howard
Escort: 4th Company Ohio Cavalry, B Company, 1st Ohio Cavalry

XV Corps

MG John A. Logan
BG Morgan L. Smith

XVI Corps

MG Grenville M. Dodge (w August 19)
BG Thomas E. G. Ransom
Escort: Company A, 52nd Illinois

XVII Corps

MG Francis P. Blair, Jr.
Escort: Company G, 9th Illinois Mounted Infantry; Company G, 11th Illinois Cavalry

Army of the Ohio (XXIII Corps)
MG John M. Schofield
Escort: Company G, 7th Ohio Cavalry

Strengths
The following table shows total strengths of each of the major formations at several stages throughout the campaign.

Notes

References
 U.S. War Department, The War of the Rebellion: a Compilation of the Official Records of the Union and Confederate Armies. Washington, DC: U.S. Government Printing Office, 1880–1901.
 Luvaas, Jay & Harold W. Nelson (eds.). Guide to the Atlanta Campaign: Rocky Face Ridge to Kennesaw Mountain (Lawrence, KS: University Press of Kansas), 2008.  

American Civil War orders of battle
Order of battle, Union, 2nd